Lambeg may refer to:

 Lambeg drum, a large Irish drum
 Lambeg, County Antrim, Northern Ireland
 Lambeg railway station, Lambeg, Northern Ireland